| goals               = 52
| top goal scorer     =  Josef Martínez Diego Valeri(4 goals each)
| prevseason          = 2017
| nextseason          = 2019
}}

The 2018 MLS Cup Playoffs (branded as the 2018 Audi MLS Cup Playoffs for sponsorship reasons) began on October 31 and ended on December 8 with MLS Cup 2018, the 23rd league championship match for MLS. This was the 23rd version of the MLS Cup Playoffs, the tournament culminating the Major League Soccer regular season. Twelve teams, the top six of each conference, competed in the MLS Cup Playoffs.

The first round of each conference had the third-seeded team hosting the sixth seed while the fourth-seed hosted the fifth seed in a single match to determine who advanced to the Conference Semifinals. In the Conference Semifinals, the top seed played the lowest remaining seed while the second played the next-lowest. The winners advanced to the Conference Finals. Both the Conference Semifinals and Conference Finals were played as a two-legged aggregate series. The winners advanced to the MLS Cup, a single match hosted by the participant with the better regular season record which was played at Mercedes-Benz Stadium in Atlanta.

Toronto FC were the defending MLS Cup champions, but failed to qualify for the playoffs. Atlanta United FC won their first MLS Cup title.

Qualified teams
Eastern Conference
Atlanta United FC
Columbus Crew SC
D.C. United
New York City FC
New York Red Bulls
Philadelphia Union

Western Conference
FC Dallas
Los Angeles FC
Portland Timbers
Real Salt Lake
Seattle Sounders FC
Sporting Kansas City

Conference standings
The top six teams from each conference advanced to the MLS Cup playoffs.

Eastern Conference

Western Conference

Bracket

Knockout round

Summary

|-
|colspan="5" bgcolor=#87CEFA align=center|Eastern Conference

|-
|colspan="5" bgcolor=#FFAEB9 align=center|Western Conference

|}

Matches

Conference Semifinals

Summary

|-
|colspan="5" bgcolor=#87CEFA|Eastern Conference

|-
|colspan="5" bgcolor=#FFAEB9|Western Conference

|}

Matches

New York Red Bulls win 3–1 on aggregate.

Atlanta United win 4–1 on aggregate.

Tied 4–4 on aggregate. Portland Timbers win 4–2 on penalties.

Sporting Kansas City win 5–3 on aggregate.

Conference Finals

Summary

|-
|colspan="5" bgcolor=#87CEFA|Eastern Conference

|-
|colspan="5" bgcolor=#FFAEB9|Western Conference

|}

Matches

Atlanta United win 3–1 on aggregate.

Portland Timbers win 3–2 on aggregate.

MLS Cup

Top goalscorers

MLS Cup Playoffs Best XI

References 

2018 Major League Soccer season
MLS Cup Playoffs
MLS Cup Playoffs
MLS Cup Playoffs
MLS Cup Playoffs